Berwyn is a village in northwestern Alberta, Canada.

The Municipal District of Peace No. 135's municipal office is located adjacent to Berwyn. The village was named after Berwyn, Denbighshire in Wales.

Demographics 

In the 2016 Census of Population conducted by Statistics Canada, the Village of Berwyn recorded a population of 538 living in 232 of its 255 total private dwellings, a  change from its 2011 population of 526.

Education 
Lloyd Garrison School is the only school located in Berwyn. It is an K-6 elementary institution administered by the Peace River School Division (PRSD). Junior and Senior high students are bussed to either Grimshaw or Peace River. Separate school students are also bussed from Berwyn to Grimshaw.
 In the 2009/10 school year, junior high enrolment at the school dropped to a total of 25 students, which triggered the PRSD to initiate a low enrolment review.

Post-secondary education is available at Northern Lakes College in the Peace River Campus and Fairview Campus of Grande Prairie Regional College in the Town of Fairview.

Economy 
Regional planning service, Mackenzie Municipal Services Agency is located in downtown Berwyn. The M.D of Peace No. 135 also has its municipal office in Berwyn.

Health care 
Health care for residents of Berwyn is provided for by Grimshaw Berwyn & District Community Health Centre in Grimshaw. The Peace River Community Health Centre is also within a short driving distance.

Recreation 
Tower Park Recreational Area – features nature and cross country ski trails, one tennis court, one baseball diamond and bird watching areas
Wayne Johnson Memorial Arena – offers skating, hockey and meeting facilities
Peace Valley Guest Ranch – offers outdoor adventure including river cruise, trail riding, hiking, mini golf and bird watching

Events 
 Alberta Pond Hockey Championships in February at Lac Cardinal
 Volunteer Week Celebrations in April
 Senior Citizens Week Celebrations in June
 Annual Christmas Parade in December
 Family Day
 Oktoberfest

Notable people 
Berwyn is the birthplace of Marco Marra, a genomics expert, and Alex Debogorski of the television show Ice Road Truckers.

See also 
List of communities in Alberta
List of villages in Alberta

References

External links 

1936 establishments in Alberta
Villages in Alberta